Fitzsimon is a surname. Notable people with the surname include:

Henry Fitzsimon (1566–1643), Irish Jesuit controversialist
Walter Fitzsimon (died 1511), Archbishop of Dublin and Lord Chancellor of Ireland

See also
Fitzsimons

Patronymic surnames
Surnames from given names